Yanaqucha (Quechua yana black, very dark, qucha lake, "black lake", Hispanicized spelling Yanacocha) is a lake in Peru located in the Ayacucho Region, Cangallo Province, Chuschi District.

References 

Lakes of Peru
Lakes of Ayacucho Region